Anders Erik Berg (né Johansson, born 30 December 1988) is a Swedish former professional footballer who played as a defender. Beginning his career at Falkenbergs FF in 2008, he went on to represent GAIS, Malmö FF, Gent, and Copenhagen before retiring at Djurgårdens IF in 2021. A full international between 2014 and 2016, he won 12 caps for the Sweden national team and played at UEFA Euro 2016.

Club career

Falkenbergs FF
Berg started his career at Superettan side Falkenbergs FF in 2008 when he was promoted to the first team squad. He was a frequent used substitute for his first season at the club but also started in 10 matches out of 23 played. For the 2009 season Berg had established himself as a regular in the starting lineup as he played 27 matches out of 30, all of which he started. He also scored 4 goals in the 2009 season as he was playing as a midfielder. His goal production increased to 7 for the 2010 season when he also played 27 matches for Falkenberg. In the 2011 season Berg managed to play 21 matches and score 6 goals before transferring to Allsvenskan club GAIS.

GAIS
Berg transferred to GAIS on 1 September 2011. GAIS expressed early on that they considered to play his as a defender instead as a midfielder. He played 7 matches and scored one goal for his first season in Allsvenskan. For the 2012 season he played 27 matches out of 30 and scored 4 goals. GAIS were relegated to Superettan at the end of the season. Berg was voted player of the year for GAIS in 2012.

Malmö FF
On 12 December 2012, Berg was presented as a Malmö FF player. He joined the club on 1 January 2013 when the transfer window opened in Sweden. Berg signed a four-year contract lasting until the end of the 2016 season. During his debut season at the club Berg played 17 matches in the league, primarily standing in for Filip Helander during the middle part of the season when he was injured. Berg scored two goals in three matches for the club during the group stage of the 2012–13 Svenska Cupen before the start of the league season. For the 2014 season Berg saw considerable more play as regular Pontus Jansson was sold during the summer transfer window. Berg made 25 appearances in the league and ten matches in the clubs 2014–15 UEFA Champions League campaign, of which five matches were in the group stage. For his performances in the league Berg was nominated for the award of Allsvenskan defender of the year.

Gent
On 9 July 2015, Berg left Swedish football for the first time as he agreed to join Belgian Pro League club Gent on a four-year contract. He was assigned the number five shirt. He made his Gent debut on 31 July 2015 in a 1–0 home victory against Genk. He went on to make eight more appearances for Gent, all in the league, before leaving the club permanently in January 2016.

Copenhagen
On 18 January 2016, Berg signed for Danish Superliga side Copenhagen for an undisclosed fee. He signed a contract until 2020 and wore the number five shirt.

Djurgårdens IF and retirement
On 26 June 2018, Berg was presented by Allsvenskan side Djurgårdens IF for an undisclosed fee rumored to be in the 8-9 million SEK range. He signed a 4.5 year contract keeping him at the Stockholm club through 2022 where he will wear the jersey number 21. In 2019, he helped the club win the 2019 Allsvenskan title.

On 11 June 2021, Berg announced his retirement from professional football after a couple of injury-plagued seasons.

International career
Berg made his international debut for Sweden in 2014. He was selected for Euro 2016 where he played in all three games before Sweden was eliminated in the group stage. Berg retired from the national team after the tournament at the age of 27, having played 12 international games.

Personal life
Berg is married to television presenter Carina Berg. He changed from Johansson to his wife's surname in 2019 after they had married.

Unlike other footballers, he had the unusual trait of being totally uninterested in watching football. He only ever watched matches when he had to prepare himself for forthcoming games, viewing the sport solely as his profession.

Career statistics

Club



International
Appearances and goals by national team and year

Honours
;Malmö FF
Allsvenskan: 2013, 2014
Svenska Supercupen: 2013, 2014

Copenhagen
 Danish Superliga: 2015–16, 2016–17
 Danish Cup: 2015–16, 2016–17

Djurgårdens IF
Allsvenskan: 2019

References

External links
Malmö FF profile 

1988 births
Living people
Swedish footballers
Sweden international footballers
Association football midfielders
People from Falkenberg
Falkenbergs FF players
GAIS players
Malmö FF players
K.A.A. Gent players
F.C. Copenhagen players
Djurgårdens IF Fotboll players
Superettan players
Allsvenskan players
Danish Superliga players
Belgian Pro League players
Swedish expatriate footballers
Expatriate footballers in Belgium
Expatriate men's footballers in Denmark
UEFA Euro 2016 players
Sportspeople from Halland County